Harcourt Island is a small island at the north side of the entrance to Royal Bay, South Georgia. It was named by the UK Antarctic Place-Names Committee in 1971 after Cape Harcourt, the easternmost point of this island.

See also 
 List of Antarctic and sub-Antarctic islands

References

Islands of South Georgia